South Korean rapper, songwriter, and record producer Min Yoon-gi, better known by his stage names Suga and Agust D, has written songs for his two solo mixtapes and multiple albums for BTS, as well as for other artists and one webcomic soundtrack. He debuted as a member of the South Korean septet BTS, managed by Big Hit Entertainment, in 2013 and rose to prominence as a songwriter for the group, co-writing many of their releases with bandmates RM and J-Hope. Several of these tracks received nominations at various domestic and international award shows, including "Spring Day", which won Song of the Year at the 2017 Melon Music Awards, and "Boy with Luv", which won Song of the Year at the 2019 Melon Music Awards and Mnet Asian Music Awards. In December 2020, he made his debut on Billboards Hot 100 Songwriters Chart at number nine, alongside RM, for their work on the group's fifth Korean-language studio album Be. It debuted at number one on the Billboard 200 while seven of its eight tracks—five of which he co-wrote—simultaneously debuted on the Hot 100 singles chart, including "Life Goes On", which became the first primarily Korean-language song to debut atop the ranking.

Suga wrote all of the songs for both of his self-produced solo mixtapes Agust D and D-2, released in 2016 and 2020 respectively. The titular lead single from his first mixtape discussed the rapper's success and identity, while the secondary single "Give it To Me" was a diss track addressing "those who would like to see him fail". For his second mixtape, co-writers on the album included Ghstloop, El Capitxn, and longtime Big Hit producer Pdogg. While D-2 contained Suga's trademark "raw sensibility and brutal honesty" also found on Agust D, the record was more "unapologetic yet humble". The lead single "Daechwita", co-written with El Capitxn, was an "anthem of victory and pride" about Suga's growth and "global success as an artist", and featured various South Korean historical and cultural references. It gained attention for its combining elements of traditional Korean music with rap and trap beats. According to Suga, the project was a documentation of his rise from nothing to being "at the top of the global music game" at age 28. Heavily impacted by the Covid-19 pandemic, he called the body of songs the "output of my time in quarantine".

Some of Suga's works for other artists include Suran's "Wine", which won Best Soul/R&B Track of the Year at the 2017 Melon Music Awards; Lee So-ra's "Song Request", in which he also featured; the co-produced "Eternal Sunshine (새벽에)" from Epik High's Sleepless in EP (2019); and Psy's "That That", which he co-wrote, co-composed, co-produced, and featured in. The Korea Music Copyright Association (KOMCA) promoted Suga to a full member in January 2018. As of 2022, 147 songs have been attributed to him as a writer and composer by KOMCA.

Songs

See also
List of songs produced by Suga

Notes

References

Suga